Sevugan Regupathy (born 30 July 1950) is an Indian Tamil politician belonging to the Dravida Munnetra Kazhagam (DMK) political party. He is currently a member of the Tamil Nadu Legislative Assembly representing Tirumayam. He is the current minister for law , Courts, Prisons and Prevention of Corruption in M. K. Stalin ministry.

Regupathy was previously a member of the 14th Lok Sabha of India, representing the now defunct Pudukkottai constituency of Tamil Nadu.

He served as Minister of State in the Ministry of Environment and Forests from 2007. He is the chairman of Karpaga Vinayaga educational group in Chennai.

References

1950 births
Living people
Dravida Munnetra Kazhagam politicians
Lok Sabha members from Tamil Nadu
India MPs 2004–2009
People from Pudukkottai district
Tamil Nadu MLAs 1991–1996
Tamil Nadu MLAs 2016–2021
Tamil Nadu MLAs 2021–2026